Marie-Claude Dion (born April 25, 1974) is a former Canadian soccer player who played as a defender. She made 27 appearances for the Canadian national team and was part of the squad that won gold at the 1998 CONCACAF Women's Championship.

Early life 
Born in Quebec City in 1974, Dion started playing soccer in Beauport at the age of eight. She was first noticed by the Canada Soccer Association in 1989, during a tournament played in Edmonton. In 1991, she joined the newly-founded Dynamo de Quebec, who played in the Ligue de soccer élite du Québec (LSEQ).

College career 
Dion started studying at Laval University in the fall of 1994; at the time, the school did not have a women's soccer programme. Later that year, a team was finally established, led by Head Coach Helder Duarte, who also coached the Dynamo de Quebec. In her first year playing for the Rouge et Or, Dion finished first in team scoring with 12 goals and was named to the U Sports All-Canadian Second Team. Additionally, she was named to the RSEQ First Team All-Star and voted the RSEQ Rookie of the Year. In her second season, she won the Chantal Navert Memorial Award, which is awarded annually to the U Sports women's soccer Player of the Year, and was named to the U Sports All-Canadian First Team for the first time. She also won the RSEQ Player of the Year award and was included in the RSEQ First Team All-Star for the second consecutive season. In her third year, she received RSEQ First Team All-Star and U Sports All-Canadian Second Team honours again. In her final season with the team, she was once again named the RSEQ Player of the Year and received RSEQ First Team All-Star honours for the fourth straight year. She was also named to the U Sports All-Canadian First Team for the second time. Thus, in April 1999, she was one of six athletes to be honoured at the annual Gala du Mérite Sportif Rouge et Or.

Club career 
After graduating from Laval University, Dion briefly relocated to British Columbia to pursue her soccer career. From 2000 to 2002, she played in the USL W-League. In 2000, she played for the Ottawa Fury. The following year, she signed for the Laval Dynamites.

International career 
Dion was the first-ever female player from Quebec to be invited to a Canadian national team camp. She was part of the team that represented Canada at the 1993 Summer Universiade in Buffalo, New York, coached by Sylvie Béliveau.

On May 12, 1996, at the age of 22, Dion made her debut for the national team in Worcester, Massachusetts, playing the full 90 minutes in a 6–0 loss to the United States at the 1996 Women's U.S. Cup. In 1997, she played again at the 1997 Women's U.S. Cup. One year later, she was part of the team that won the 1998 CONCACAF Women's Championship, which served as a qualifier for the 1999 FIFA Women's World Cup. In 2000, she participated at the 2000 CONCACAF Women's Gold Cup, where Canada finished in fourth place. She made her 27th and final national team appearance on March 15, 2001, in a 2–1 victory over Portugal at the 2001 Algarve Cup.

Dion officially retired from the national team in the summer of 2002, at the age of 28.

Career statistics

International

Honours

International 
Canada
 CONCACAF Women's Championship: 1998

Individual 

 FSQ Female Senior Player of Excellence: 1996
 FSQ Female Youth Elite Player: 1995
 Chantal Navert Memorial Award: 1996
 RSEQ Player of the Year: 1996, 1998
 U Sports All-Canadian First Team: 1996, 1998
 U Sports All-Canadian Second Team: 1995, 1997
 RSEQ First Team All-Star: 1995, 1996, 1997, 1998
 RSEQ Rookie of the Year: 1995

References

External links 
 

1974 births
Living people
Canada women's international soccer players
Canadian women's soccer players
French Quebecers
Laval Rouge et Or athletes
Soccer people from Quebec
Université Laval alumni
Women's association football defenders
Ottawa Fury (women) players
USL W-League (1995–2015) players